Blaine F. Calkins  (born December 25, 1968) is a Conservative Member of Parliament in the House of Commons of Canada. He has represented the riding of Red Deer—Lacombe in Alberta since 2015, having previously represented its predecessor, Wetaskiwin, since 2006.

Calkins was born and raised in the Lacombe, Alberta area. He graduated from the University of Alberta in 1992 with a Bachelor of Science with specialization in zoology. He later became a tenured faculty member at Red Deer College. He began his career in politics as a member of the Lacombe Town Council, and as such has been involved with the board of directors of the Lacombe Municipal Ambulance Society, the board of directors for Family and Community Support Services, The Municipal Planning Commission, David Thompson Tourist Council and the Disaster Services Committee.

Blaine Calkins became a member of the Reform Party in 1996, and followed most of the party into the Canadian Alliance in 2000 and the Conservative Party in 2004. He served on the Candidate Nomination Committee for the Reform Party in Wetaskiwin riding in 1999, and joined the board of directors for the Alliance's riding nomination committee in 2000. Since then, he has held various board positions, including president, vice president and director of communications.

He was elected to Parliament for Wetaskiwin in 2006. The riding was abolished in 2015, and Calkins successfully ran in Red Deer—Lacombe, essentially the southern part of his old riding (including its largest city, Lacombe) combined with the northern half of the old Red Deer riding.

Political career

CPC Alberta Caucus Chair

Blaine served as the Caucus Chair for the Alberta Caucus of the Conservative Party of Canada in both the 41st and 42nd Parliament. As the Caucus Chair, Blaine has been responsible for facilitating dialogue between all of the Conservative MPs from Alberta and helping to coherently present issues effecting the province to Regional Ministers while in Government and directly to Conservative Leadership while in opposition. Given the size of the Alberta Conservative Caucus and the various Ministers and prominent Members of Parliament from Alberta, previously including Premier Jason Kenney and former Interim Leader of the Official Opposition the Hon. Rona Ambrose, Alberta Caucus continues to be an important voice in the Conservative Parliamentary Caucus.

Ethics

From February 4, 2016 to September 18, 2017 Calkins was the Chair of the Standing Committee on Access to Information, Privacy and Ethics. During his time as Chair the committee undertook important studies including a review of the Privacy Act, the Access to Information Act and a review of the Security of Canada Information Sharing Act 

In January 2017, while Chair of the Ethics Committee, Calkins wrote a letter  to then Ethics Commissioner, Mary Dawson, highlighting a number of concerns he had about a trip Prime Minister Trudeau had accepted to the Bahamas. On December 20, 2017 the Ethics Commissioner released her report, finding that the Prime Minister had violated multiple sections of the Conflict of Interest Act, including sections that Calkins had raised in his letter.

Conservative Hunting and Angling Caucus

Blaine helped found and served as vice-chair and is currently the chair of the Conservative Hunting and Angling Caucus (CHAC). The CHAC was founded in order to help ensure that hunters, anglers, trappers and all those who participate in the outdoor way of life are robustly represented in the Conservative Party and in parliament. As a former Park Warden and avid outdoorsman, Blaine passionately defends the outdoor way of life, in order to ensure that future generations are able to continue this important way of life, and that Canadians have access to public lands to sustainably harvest wildlife resources as Canadians have since first contact, and First Nations people have since time immemorial.

Political views

Support for Labourers
In the 41st Parliament, Calkins passed a Private Members Bill called the Employees’ Voting Rights Act  to make union certification votes down by secret ballot, to help prevent intimidation tactics that have been reported during certification proceedings under the card-check system. The Act also set the threshold to trigger a certification or decertification vote at 45% of bargaining unit members indicating they wish to have a vote, and standardized the secret ballot threshold for the successful creation or continuation of a bargaining agent. While the Employees’ Voting Rights Act passed and became law under the Conservative Government, one of the first acts of the Trudeau Government was to repeal these protections for workers.

Honouring Korean War Veterans
Calkins co-sponsored legislation with Senator Yonah Martin to make the 27th of July each year known as “National Korean War Veterans Day.” The Korean War is also known as the Forgotten War, receiving much less attention than other conflicts in which Canada played a vital role. Calkins and Senator Martin believed Canadians have a duty to recognize the sacrifice of over 26,000 men and women who courageously defended the principles of peace, freedom and democracy in the Korean peninsula, in particular the 516 who made the ultimate sacrifice. Calkins continues to pay homage to the men and women of the Canadian Armed Forces both past and present who have given so much to preserve our freedom.

Rural Crime
Calkins has been actively working on addressing the rural crime issue in Canada. In Fall of 2017 Calkins co-chaired the CPC Alberta MP Rural Crime Taskforce. This was in partnership with United Conservative Party MLAs who conducted a similar study. The task force met with residents from rural Alberta, including community groups and law enforcement to hear about concerns of residents province-wide and compiled a report making recommendations to the government of Canada to address the issue of rural crime. The report was submitted as a brief to the Standing Committee on Public Safety and Emergency Preparedness during their study on M-167  about rural crime. The Liberals on the committee rejected all of the recommendations, causing the Conservative Members to submit a dissenting report.

Calkins put forward a Private Members Bill, C-458, which seeks to make remoteness an aggravating factor at sentencing, in response to what he called an “insulting” report from the Committee on Public Safety. While the bill was unable to be advanced past first reading in the 42nd Parliament, Calkins committed to reintroducing it if re-elected. Alberta Justice Minister Dough Schweitzer wrote a letter supporting Calkins PMB.

Carbon tax

According to a December 14, 2018 recording by a Radio-Canada reporter of a talk given by Calkins to students in grades 7 and 8 in Red Deer, Calkins responded to a question about the carbon tax by saying that he was a biologist and that  was plant food not pollution. He told students that he understood there was an impact on the environment from burning fossil fuels but he questioned whether burning fossil fuels "caused extreme weather events". Calkins told them, "There's just more people now than there was before. So, when we have a major weather event, more people get affected, because the chances of it affecting people are that much higher."

In a follow-up article on December 18, Conseil Scolaire Centre-Nord's (CSCN) superintendent, Robert Lessard, responded by saying that these comments were Calkins' own personal opinions, whereas in CSCN, they teach facts about the "biological cycle of carbon", and "ecological impacts [of environment on the planet] that need to be taken care of."

Shawn Marshall, who is a University of Calgary Geography professor as well as a Tier II Canada Research Chair in Climate Change, said that Calkins' "half truths" without context, are typical examples of "climate misinformation" used by politicians who oppose the carbon tax, "to paralyze us a little bit". His concern was that they were introduced to junior youth. Marshall said that Calkins failed to add that humans are generating more  than plants can take up, and that while we do have a larger population vulnerable to extreme weather events, "there's also this huge overprint of climate change on these extreme weather events."

Electoral record

References

External links
Blaine Calkins website

1968 births
Conservative Party of Canada MPs
Living people
Members of the House of Commons of Canada from Alberta
People from Lacombe, Alberta
People from Ponoka, Alberta
University of Alberta alumni
21st-century Canadian politicians
Alberta municipal councillors